José Luis Fernández (born 26 October 1987) is an Argentine footballer who plays as a midfielder for Nueva Chicago. He is a left-footed player who usually plays on the left wing.

Club career
In July 2013, Fernández signed a permanent deal with Godoy Cruz, with Godoy buying half of his economic rights from S.L. Benfica.

On 9 January 2015, Rosario Central signed Fernández for 4 years.

Career statistics

International career
Fernández was called up for the Argentina national team to play a game against Haiti. All the players in Diego Maradona's squad were from the Argentine Primera División. Fernández made his international debut in the 60th minute, substituting Ariel Ortega.

Honours
Benfica
Taça da Liga: 2010–11

References

External links
 Argentine Primera statistics at Fútbol XXI  
 
 

1987 births
Living people
Argentina international footballers
Argentine footballers
Argentine expatriate footballers
Association football midfielders
Argentine Primera División players
Primeira Liga players
Racing Club de Avellaneda footballers
S.L. Benfica footballers
Estudiantes de La Plata footballers
S.C. Olhanense players
Godoy Cruz Antonio Tomba footballers
Rosario Central footballers
Defensa y Justicia footballers
Atlético Tucumán footballers
Expatriate footballers in Portugal
Sportspeople from Buenos Aires Province